Lydia Eudoria Ashburne Evans ( – January 14, 1992) was an American physician.

Biography
Ashburne was born around 1887. She grew up in Bowers Hill, Virginia and was part of a big family with fourteen siblings. Her parents had been formerly enslaved people. Ashburne graduated from Norfolk Mission College in 1908 and went on to earn her medical degree from Howard University Medical School in 1912. Ashburne briefly practiced medicine in Virginia before she moved to Chicago and began working there in 1916. Ashburne worked as a physician for around 65 years and provided charity work for many people in Chicago. Ashburne created the South Side office of the United Cerebral Palsy. Later in life, she married Theodore R. P. Evans. She died on January 14, 1992, in Hyde Park.

References

External links 
 Letter from Dr. L. Eudora Ashburne to Mabel K. Staupers, 1941, March 23

1880s births
1992 deaths
American centenarians
African-American women physicians
African-American physicians
Howard University College of Medicine alumni
People from Chicago
Women centenarians
People from Chesapeake, Virginia
20th-century African-American people
20th-century African-American women